Royal Independent School District (RISD) is a public school district based in Pattison, Texas (USA).

In addition to Pattison, the district also serves the city of Brookshire and the community of Sunnyside.

The district was established in January 1959 as the Pattison-Brookshire Consolidated Independent School District, when the citizens of the Brookshire and Pattison School Districts voted to consolidate.  In February 1960, the Board of Trustees adopted the district's current name.

In 2009, the school district was rated "academically acceptable" by the Texas Education Agency.

Schools

Royal High School (Pattison; Grades 9-12)
Royal Middle School (Pattison; Grades 6-8)
Royal Elementary School (Pattison; Grades 1-5)
Royal Early Childhood Center (Pattison; Grades PK-K)
Royal STEM Academy (Pattison; Grades 3-10)
Royal Early College High School (Pattison; 9-10)

Royal ISD opened a new two-story high school and new early childhood center.  The buildings were completed by the 2009-2010 school year.

References

External links
Royal ISD

School districts in Waller County, Texas